Greensburg may refer to:

Places
In the United States
Greensburg, Indiana
Greensburg, Kansas
Greensburg, Kentucky
Greensburg, Louisiana
Greensburg, Missouri
Greensburg, Ohio
 Greensburg Township, Putnam County, Ohio
Greensburg, Pennsylvania
Greensburg, West Virginia

Other
"Greensburg", a track on Fetchin Bones' second album, Bad Pumpkin
Greensburg (TV series) (2008-2010), about the rebuilding of Greensburg (Kansas) after being struck by an EF5 tornado